Réhon is a commune in the Meurthe-et-Moselle department in north-eastern France. It is the town where Jean-Marc Reiser (1941-1983) was born.

See also 
 Communes of the Meurthe-et-Moselle department

References

External links 

 La Providence – Rehon
 La Providence – Rehon

Communes of Meurthe-et-Moselle